London Game may refer to:

NBA London Game, in basketball
 The London Game, a board game